The Élan DP02 is a sports prototype race car, designed, developed, and produced by American manufacturer Élan Motorsport, for the IMSA Prototype Challenge, between 2006 and 2012.

References 

Sports prototypes
Panoz vehicles